The range of area codes 900–999 in Mexico is reserved for Campeche, Chiapas, Oaxaca, Puebla, Quintana Roo, Tabasco, Veracruz and Yucatán.

(For other areas, see Area codes in Mexico by code.)

External links
http://www.rebtel.com/en/phone-codes/Mexico/
https://www.ladademexico.com.mx/clave-lada-999-de-donde-es/
http://mexicotelefonos.com/codigos/
http://www.sre.gob.mx/austin/Util/LadasMexico.html
http://www.aproxima.es/llamadas/mexico.html

9